Paul Geaney (born 27 November 1990) is an Irish Gaelic footballer who plays for Dingle and at senior level for the Kerry county team. He usually lines out as a forward.

Career
Geaney first came to prominence at juvenile and underage levels with the Dingle club. He joined the club's senior team in 2007 and won a Kerry Club Championship title in 2015. Geaney first lined out at inter-county level as captain of the Kerry minor team that won the Munster Minor Championship in 2008. After an unsuccessful two-year tenure with the Kerry under-21 team, he was drafted onto the Kerry senior football team during the 2011 league. After a number of years as a panel member, Geaney eventually broke onto the starting fifteen and was at right corner-forward when Kerry beat Donegal in the 2014 All-Ireland SFC final. His other honours include National League and Munster Championship titles.

Personal life
Geaney works in the family business in Paul Geaney's Bar and Restaurant in Dingle. He married Siún Ó Sé, daughter of Páidí Ó Sé, in December 2018.

Career statistics

Honours
University College Cork
Sigerson Cup: (2) 2011, 2014 (c)
Cork Senior Football Championship: (1) 2011 

Dingle
Kerry Club Football Championship: (1) 2015
Kerry County Football League Division 1: (1) 2021
West Kerry Senior Football Championship: (10) 2007, 2010, 2012, 2013, 2014 , 2016, 2018, 2019, 2020, 2021

Kerry
All-Ireland Senior Football Championship: 2014
Munster Senior Football Championship: 2011, 2013, 2014, 2015, 2016, 2017, 2018, 2019, 2021
National Football League: 2017, 2020, 2021
All-Ireland Under-21 B Hurling Championship: 2010
Munster Minor Football Championship: 2008 (c)

References

1990 births
Living people
All Stars Awards winners (football)
Dingle Gaelic footballers
Drinking establishment owners
Dual players
Irish restaurateurs
Kerry inter-county Gaelic footballers
Kerry inter-county hurlers
Kilmoyley hurlers
Ó Sé family 
People from Dingle